The Asian Institute of Management (AIM) is an international management school and research institution. It is one of the few business schools in Asia to be internationally accredited with the Association to Advance Collegiate Schools of Business (AACSB). It was established in partnership with Harvard Business School and uses the Harvard Business School case study teaching methodology. Prof Stephen Fuller of the Harvard Business School was its first president, to be succeeded by another professor from Harvard. It was described by Asiaweek magazine (a Time Inc. publication) as the best in the Asia-Pacific region in terms of executive education.

History 
The institute was established in 1968 in partnership with Ateneo de Manila University, De La Salle University, Harvard Business School, the Ford Foundation, and visionaries of the Asian academic and business communities. It is located in Makati, Metro Manila, Philippines. AIM has a local board of trustees and an international board of governors.

Organization and administration 
AIM is a member of the following associations: 

 Association to Advance Collegiate Schools of Business (AACSB) 
 Global Network for Advanced Management (GNAM) 
 Association of Asia-Pacific Business Schools (AAPBS) 
 European Foundation for Management Development (EFMD) Global Business School Network (GBSN), Graduate Management Admission Council (GMAC), and Pacific Asian Consortium for International Business Education and Research (PACIBER). AIM is also a signatory to the Principles for Responsible Management Education (PRME).

Academics

Asian Institute of Management has four schools.

Washington SyCip Graduate School of Business  

The Washington SyCip Graduate School of Business (SyCip School) offers two degree programs: the 12-month Master in Business Administration and the Executive MBA program. Instruction is based primarily on the case method developed at Harvard Business School. The school applies American and European management principles to problems in Asia.

Stephen Zuellig Graduate School of Development Management 

The Stephen Zuellig Graduate School of Development Management (Zuellig School) has an 11-month Master in Development Management program intended for executives and managers from developing nations. AIM used to offer a Rural Development Management Program in 1976, followed by a Program for Development Managers (PDM) in 1985. PDM then became the core course for the MDM program in 1989. The Center for Development Management at AIM was formally established as a school in 1991. It was renamed the Stephen Zuellig Graduate School of Development Management on March 13, 2014, in honor of Dr. Stephen Zuellig.

School of Executive Education and Lifelong Learning 

The School of Executive Education and Lifelong Learning (SEELL) is AIM's executive development arm. SEELL has two types of programs: Open Enrollment Programs and Custom Programs designed for the specific needs of the client organization. Open Enrollment Programs include programs for general management, strategy, operations, leadership and people management, innovation, and finance.

Aboitiz School of Innovation, Technology, and Entrepreneurship 

The Aboitiz School of Innovation, Technology, and Entrepreneurship (ASITE) was established in 2017 and offers five programs: the 15-month Master of Science in Innovation and Business, the 15-month Master of Science in Data Science, the 18-month Master in Entrepreneurship, a 4-year double undergraduate Data Science and Business Administration program with the University of Houston, and the first PhD in Data Science program in the Philippines. ASITE also houses an AI R&D laboratory called the Analytics, Computing, and Complex Systems (ACCeSs) lab.

International Student Exchange Program 
Under the International Student Exchange Program (ISEP), AIM's top MBA students are given the opportunity to study at a partner school in a different country. AIM partner schools are located in Australia, Austria, Canada, Denmark, France, Germany, India, Japan, Mexico, Norway, Poland, South Korea, Switzerland, USA, and Venezuela.

Washington SyCip Memorial Fund 
The Washington SyCip Memorial Fund was established after the passing of SyCip in 2017. A lead gift of US$5 million (or almost ₱260 million) was donated by an anonymous philanthropist.

Rankings 
The consulting organization and publisher of global academic rankings Center for World University Rankings (CWUR) ranks the Asian Institute of Management as first among all Philippine universities and 1079th worldwide.

Research 
Asian Institute of Management features several research centers and one incubator:

Asian Institute of Management-Rizalino S. Navarro Policy Center for Competitiveness 

The Asian Institute of Management-Rizalino S. Navarro Policy Center for Competitiveness (AIM-RSN PCC) was established in 1996 and serves as AIM's public policy think tank and research arm. The Center focuses on emerging international economic trends and the demands of a competitive global trade and finance environment. AIM-RSN PCC was formerly known as the AIM Policy Center but was renamed in 2015 in honor of former Philippine Secretary of Trade and Industry Rizalino S. Navarro.

Ramon V. del Rosario Sr.-Center for Corporate Social Responsibility 

The Ramon V. del Rosario Sr.-Center for Corporate Social Responsibility (AIM RVR Center) focuses on corporate social responsibility and corporate governance. It was established in 2000 and conducts both research and non-research activities. The center was named after Ramon V. Del Rosario Sr., Founder and Chairman of the PHINMA Group. It manages the Hills Program on Governance established by the American International Group through its C.V. Starr Foundation.

Team Energy Center for Bridging Leadership 

The Team Energy Center for Bridging Leadership (CBL) was founded by Prof. Ernesto Garilao after he was inspired by a global research project on “bridging leadership” conducted by the Synergos Institute in 2000. CBL's focus is on developing “Bridging Leaders” who will address societal divides in the Philippines and in Asia. CBL was formerly called the Center for Bridging Societal Divides.

Gov. Jose B. Fernandez Jr. Center for Banking and Finance 

The Gov. Jose B. Fernandez Jr. Center for Banking and Finance (JBF) was launched in 1994 in honor of the late Philippine Central Bank governor Jose B. Fernandez Jr. JBF focuses on researching issues faced by the financial services industry, improving the competence of Asian financial managers, and building alliances between Asian business institutions.

Dr. Andrew L. Tan Center for Tourism 

The Dr. Andrew L. Tan Center for Tourism provides studies that support the Philippine tourism and hospitality industry. It was established in 2012 in partnership with Megaworld Foundation and is mainly focused on the development of sustainable tourism in the Philippines and the rest of Asia.

AIM-Dado Banatao Incubator 
AIM-Dado Banatao Incubator provides technology, science, or engineering startups with mentorship and training. The chief adviser of the incubator is Dado Banatao, an entrepreneur who has invested in numerous startups in the Philippines and the US. The incubator was founded under the joint partnership and leadership of AIM, DOST, and PhilDev Foundation. The Incubator won as the "Best Incubator Startup Program" at the DOST Startup Incubator Awards in April 2021.

Notable alumni 

Bhutan
 Dil Maya Rai
France
 Bertrand Thuillier (MDM 1985) - software publisher
India
 Ashok Soota (MBM 1973) - Ex-Chairman and Managing Director, Mindtree Ltd.
 Kalyan Krishnamoorthy (MBA 2000) - CEO, Flipkart
Indonesia
 Soni Sumarsono
Malaysia
 Hasan Arifin
 Bishan Singh
Philippines
 Tony Tan Caktiong (TMP 1983) - founder, CEO, and President, Jollibee Foods Corp. Philippines; winner of Ernst & Young World Entrepreneur of the Year Award
 Jesli Lapus (MBM 1973) - former Secretary of Education, former CEO of Land Bank of the Philippines
 Martin Andanar (ME 2007) - Secretary of the Presidential Communications Group, former news anchor under TV5 and GMA
 Angelo Reyes (MBM 1973) - former Secretary of Energy; former Secretary of National Defense; former Chief of Staff of the Armed Forces of the Philippines
 Renato de Villa (MBM 1972) - former Executive Secretary and Defense Secretary
 Josemari Macasaquit (Masters in Business Administration 2017) - Owner, Fast Food Chains, Rockwell, Makati Philippines & California, U.S.A.
 Raphael Juan - CEO, and President, Centro Manufacturing Corporation
 Victor José I. Luciano (MBA 1970) - President/CEO, Clark International Airport Corporation
Singapore
 Robert Chandran (MBM 1974) - President, Chemoil Corporation
Sri-Lanka
 P. B. Abeykoon - attorney in the Supreme Court

References

External links
 

 
Graduate schools in the Philippines
Business schools in the Philippines
Amherst College
Harvard Business School
World Bank
Research institutes in Metro Manila
Universities and colleges in Makati
1968 establishments in the Philippines